Tamehr (also Romanized as Ţāmehr; also known as Tāmar and Tamer) is a village in Allahabad Rural District, Zarach District, Yazd County, Yazd Province, Iran. At the 2006 census, its population was 57, in 24 families.

References 

Populated places in Yazd County